Max Bacon is a British rock singer for Nightwing and GTR.

Max Bacon may also refer to:

Max Bacon (politician) (born 1941), Missouri jurist and legislator
Max Bacon (actor) (1906–1969), British musician and film and TV actor